{{Infobox CBB Team
| current = 2022–23 UMBC Retrievers men's basketball team
| name = UMBC Retrievers
| logo = UMBC Athletics wordmark.png
| logo_size = 200
| university = University of Maryland, Baltimore County
| conference = America East
| location = Catonsville, Maryland
| coach = Jim Ferry
| tenure = 1st
| arena = Chesapeake Employers Insurance Arena
| capacity = 5,000
| nickname = Retrievers
| studentsection = Hilltop Hysteria 
| h_pattern_b = _thinsidesonwhite
| h_body = FFC20E
| h_shorts = FFC20E
| h_pattern_s = _blanksides2
| 3_pattern_b = _thingoldsides
| 3_body = CCCCCC
| 3_shorts = CCCCCC
| 3_pattern_s = _thingoldsides
| a_pattern_b = _thinblacksides
| a_body = FFC20E
| a_shorts = FFC20E
| a_pattern_s = _blacksides
| NCAAchampion2 =
| NCAAchampion =
| NCAAfinalfour =
| NCAAeliteeight =
| NCAAsweetsixteen =
| NCAAroundof32 = 2018 
| NCAAtourneys = 2008, 2018
| conference_tournament = 2008, 2018
| conference_season = Northeast Conference1999

America East Conference2008, 2021''
}}

The UMBC Retrievers men's basketball''' team represents the University of Maryland, Baltimore County in National Collegiate Athletic Association (NCAA) Division I competition as a member of the America East Conference. They play their home games at Chesapeake Employers Insurance Arena in Catonsville, Maryland. Their current head coach is Jim Ferry.

UMBC made its first Division I postseason appearance in the NCAA tournament in 2008, in which it qualified by winning the America East tournament. 

The Retrievers are best known for when they qualified for their second NCAA tournament appearance in 2018 by beating the Vermont Catamounts in the America East tournament final and became the first No. 16 seed to defeat a No. 1 seed in the NCAA men's tournament, beating No. 1-seeded Virginia 74–54. The win has been called the greatest upset in college basketball history.

Postseason

NCAA Division I Tournament results
The Retrievers have appeared in the NCAA Division I tournament two times. Their combined record is 1–2.

CIT results
The Retrievers have appeared in the CollegeInsider.com Postseasn Tournament once. Their record is 3–1.

The Basketball Classic results
The Retrievers have appeared in The Basketball Classic one time. Their record is 0–1.

 – UMBC withdrew from the tournament citing health concerns and not enough players. As a result Merrimack was granted a 2–0 win.

NCAA Division II Tournament results
The Retrievers have appeared in the NCAA Division II tournament two times. Their combined record is 3–2.

Records

References